Apodia bifractella is a moth of the family Gelechiidae. It is found in most of Europe, as well as Turkey, the Caucasus and North Africa.

The wingspan is 9–12 mm. Adults are on wing from July to August.

The larvae feed on Pulicaria dysenterica, Inula conyzae and Aster tripolium. They feed within the seedheads of their host plant. Larvae can be found from October to April. They are shaped as Diptera larva and are translucent off-white with an off-white head. The species overwinters in the larval stage. Pupation takes place within the seedhead.

References

Moths described in 1843
Isophrictini
Moths of Asia
Moths of Europe
Moths of Africa